Semperdon is a genus of small air-breathing land snails, terrestrial pulmonate gastropod mollusks in the family Charopidae.

Species
Species within the genus Semperdon include:
 Semperdon heptaptychius
 Semperdon kororensis
 Semperdon rotanus
 Semperdon uncatus
 Semperdon xyleborus

References

 GBIF info on the genus

 
Charopidae
Taxonomy articles created by Polbot